Smart Guy is a 1943 American crime film directed by Lambert Hillyer and written by John W. Krafft and Charles R. Marion. The film stars Rick Vallin, Veda Ann Borg, Bobby Larson, Wanda McKay, Jack La Rue and Mary Gordon. The film was released on December 17, 1943, by Monogram Pictures.

Plot

Cast          
Rick Vallin as Johnny Reagan
Veda Ann Borg as Lee
Bobby Larson as Bobby
Wanda McKay as Jean Wickers
Jack La Rue as Matt Taylor
Mary Gordon as Maggie
Paul McVey as Kilbourne
Addison Richards as Ben Carter
Roy Darmour as Kearns
John Dawson as Evans 
Dan White as Sheriff

References

External links
 

1943 films
1940s English-language films
American crime films
1943 crime films
Monogram Pictures films
Films directed by Lambert Hillyer
American black-and-white films
1940s American films